Joshua Peter Record (born 20 November 1987) is an English singer-songwriter who has released one album, Pillars, and one EP. He has also had various success as a songwriter and producer for many artists including Sigala, Paloma Faith, Becky Hill, Tom Grennan, Tiesto, Merk & Kremont, Joe Jonas, DNCE, Ella Henderson, Anne Marie, MNEK and LP.

Early life
Josh Record was born in Stroud, Gloucestershire, England, the son of a BFBS DJ, whom he cites as "my greatest influence". At the age of 16 he moved to London to study music at the BRIT School. He became involved in local charities on the Alton Estate teaching music and participating in related projects, working with young people involved in gangs.

Music career

His first release on indie label National Anthem in 2012 made it to number 2 in the Singer Songwriter charts on iTunes in the UK. The lead track "For Your Love" was heralded by everyone from Steve Lamacq to Zane Lowe to The Sunday Times who said "His keening falsetto invites comparisons to Bon Iver's Justin Vernon... Record has a sensational debut album in him".

His next self produced EP "The War" received critical acclaim and Zane Lowe made the title track his "Hottest Record of 2013" on BBC Radio 1, as well as live performances on BBC Radio 2, and BBC Radio 6 Music.

In 2013 Josh Record signed a deal with Virgin Records and in late November 2013 went on to release his EP "Bones", that has been play listed on BBC Radio 1. "Bones" EP also features remixes from Alt-J, Fryars, and FTSE. Bones was also the featured song to close the winter finale episode of the tenth season of Grey's Anatomy.

In March 2014, Josh Record re-released "For Your Love" on Virgin Records. Zane Lowe of BBC Radio 1 made it his "Hottest Record in The World" on 26 February 2014. The song was remixed by London Grammar.

Josh Record's debut album Pillars was released on 14 July 2014, receiving 5-star reviews from the Sunday Times and Daily Mail. This was followed by a sold-out headline tour in October.

He has written and produced for many artists and signed a publishing deal with Warner Chappell in 2017. He has been working with Sigala, Paloma Faith, Dua Lipa, Becky Hill, Tom Grennan, Tiësto, Merk & Kremont, Joe Jonas, DNCE, Anne Marie, Ella Henderson, MNEK, David Guetta, Calum Scott, Wilkinson, Mr. Probz, Steve Aoki, Don Diablo, Tim Hughes, Jones and Jorja Smith as well as many others.

In 2014 he co wrote and produced the Official UK Top 20 Single Yours, by Ella Henderson.

In 2016 he co wrote and produced LP's Muddy Waters that received international recognition after closing Season 4 of Orange Is The New Black.

In 2018 he co wrote the Top 10 UK single 'Lullaby' for Sigala and Paloma Faith.

In 2018 he co wrote and produced Merk & Kremont's track Hands Up featuring DNCE and the vocals of Joe Jonas.

Discography

Albums
 14 July 2014 - Pillars

EPs

 June 2013 - The War

Singles

 July 2013 - The War
 November 2013 - Bones
 January 2014 - Wonder
 March 2014 - For Your Love
 July 2014 - Wide Awake
 June 2017 - Do

Music videos published on YouTube & Vevo
 2 July 2013 - The War
 29 October 2013 - Bones
 12 March 2014 - For Your Love
 14 June 2014 - Wide Awake

Songwriting Credits
 indicates a background vocal contribution.

 indicates an un-credited vocal contribution.

Live performance

Josh Record played throughout the summer of 2013 and 2014 at music festivals including Glastonbury Festival, Hard Rock Calling, Latitude Festival, and T in The Park Festival.

Josh Record has supported the likes of London Grammar, Bastille, Lorde, Rodriguez, Michael Kiwanuka and touring across UK and Europe with Sam Smith in February 2014.

References

External links
 
 National Anthem label

1987 births
Living people
English male singer-songwriters
People from Stroud
21st-century English singers
21st-century British male singers